Aristolochia quangbinhensis is an endemic flora species in the Aristolochia genus.

Description
The species has petiole 1.5–2.5(–3) cm long; lamina elliptic to oblong-elliptic; peduncle 1.5–2  cm long, covered with yellow-brown trichomes; perianth limb bell-shaped, 2–2.5(–3) cm wide, exclusively purplish-pink on both sides, no blotches or veins are visible; perianth margins recurved; flower tube mouth slightly darker than the remaining perianth limb; perianth tube pale yellow to whitish and the entire back of the perianth limb and tube covered with yellow-brown trichomes. 

In the humid region of the northeastern mountains in Phong Nha-Ke Bang National Park, Quang Binh province, Aristolochia quangbinhensis grows as a single population underneath the primary, broad-leaved, evergreen forest. Anthropogenic threats, such as excessive logging, have resulted in the vulnerability of this new flora species and put it in an endangered status.

References

External links 
 
 
 Discovery of a new plant species – Aristolochia quangbinhensis Do VAST 13-3-2014

quangbinhensis
Plants described in 2014
Endemic flora of Vietnam